The Caracas Military Circle is the name given to a multipurpose complex whose main structures are located at the end of Los Próceres Avenue on Las Américas Boulevard, Santa Monica in the Libertador Municipality west of the Caracas Metropolitan District and north of the South American country from Venezuela. At present, its structures depend on the Ministry of Defense of Venezuela.

Originally a set of farms called «Conejo Blanco» (White Rabbit) and in a space of 25 hectares, the general idea was raised in 1943, its construction began in 1950 by the Ministry of Public Works, being inaugurated by the government of General Marcos Pérez Jiménez on December 2, 1953. The design was commissioned to the architect Luis Malaussena who was also in charge of the «Paseo La Nacionalidad» (Nationality Walk).

For its historical importance, and its sumptuous design was declared a national historical monument in 1994. It includes a military, social center, clubs, a theater and a hotel,

See also 
 History of Venezuela
 Fort Tiuna

References 

Buildings and structures in Caracas